Sylvia Beatrice Anderson (25 March 1927 – 15 March 2016) was an English television and film producer, writer, voice actress and costume designer, best known for her collaborations with Gerry Anderson, her husband between 1960 and 1981. In addition to serving as co-creator and co-writer on their TV series during the 1960s and early 1970s, Anderson's primary contribution was character development and costume design. She regularly directed the fortnightly voice recording sessions, and provided the voices of many female and child characters.  She also helped develop the shows and characters, in particular creating the iconic characters of Lady Penelope and Parker in Thunderbirds.

Early life
Anderson was born in Camberwell, London, England on 25 March 1927. Her father, Sidney Thomas, was a champion boxer, and her mother, Beatrice, a dressmaker.

After graduating from the London School of Economics with a degree in sociology and political science, she became a social worker. She emigrated to the United States to live with her first husband, Jack Brooks, an American golfer. While in America she worked as a journalist.

Career
Anderson returned to the United Kingdom in 1955 with her daughter. She joined the newly founded and short-lived Polytechnic Films as an office assistant in 1957. There, she met Gerry Anderson, an editor and director. That year, when Anderson and Arthur Provis created AP Films following Polytechnic's collapse, she joined them on the board of directors of the new company, alongside their colleagues John Read and Reg Hill.

Collaboration with Gerry Anderson
In 1957 AP Films was commissioned by writer Roberta Leigh to produce films based on her children's stories, including The Adventures of Twizzle and Torchy the Battery Boy. Sylvia Anderson worked on these projects as a production assistant. In late 1960 the couple married, and she developed a wider role in production duties.

The couple worked together as a team, co-writing and co-creating the first episode of a series then sharing the work according to their strengths. Gerry tended to specialise in special effects and hardware, and Sylvia in character, voices, costume, dialogue, and plotlines.

In this way, Anderson contributed plot development and voice work for a series of half-hour shows including Supercar, Stingray and Fireball XL5. The Supercar end titles credit her (as Sylvia Thamm) as the Dialogue Director, a task which she would also handle in other projects.  However, she felt the half-hour format was insufficient to fully develop characters and stories, and she persuaded the team's TV producer Lew Grade to extend their shows to a full hour.

In the early 1960s, the Andersons co-created the series Thunderbirds, and Sylvia created the characters. She was aware that Grade intended to sell the show to American TV networks and wanted to make the show appealing to American audiences, hence she introduced the "British aristocrat" character of Lady Penelope, and Parker her "Cockney chauffeur".

Lady Penelope Creighton-Ward, an aristocratic fashionista who was an undercover agent, was to become one of her most popular characters; Anderson both created the character and provided her voice. AP Films puppet designer Mary Turner used Anderson as the template for the creation of the Lady Penelope puppets, a decision of which Anderson was not immediately aware. Interviewed by the Daily Mirror in 1968, Turner commented: "we wanted a glamorous blonde and [Anderson] was the obvious choice." In 1966 and 1968, Anderson produced two feature-length films based on the Thunderbirds story, Thunderbirds Are Go and Thunderbird 6.

She was co-creator with Gerry Anderson for the series UFO (1969-1970) on which she co-produced, was responsible for fashions on the show and did the majority of the casting.

The Andersons' creative partnership ended when their marriage broke down during the production of the first series of Space: 1999 in 1975. Gerry announced his intention to separate on the evening of the wrap party, following which Sylvia ceased her involvement with the company, which by this time had twice been renamed and was now called Group Three.

Talent scout and writing
In 1983 she published a novel titled Love and Hisses and in 1994 she reprised her voice role as Lady Penelope for an episode of Absolutely Fabulous. She worked as a London-based talent scout for HBO for 30 years.

Her autobiography, Yes M'Lady, was first published in 1991; in 2007, it was re-published as My FAB Years with new material to bring it up to date with the latest developments in her life, such as her role as a production consultant for the 2004 live-action film adaptation of Thunderbirds.

Of the film, Anderson commented, "I'm personally thrilled that the production team have paid us the great compliment of bringing to life our original concept for the big screen. If we had made it ourselves (and we have had over 30 years to do it!) we could not have improved on this new version. It is a great tribute to the original creative team who inspired the movie all those years ago. It was a personal thrill for me to see my characters come to life on the big screen." My FAB Years was re-released as a spoken CD, narrated by Anderson, in 2010.

Late career and charity work
In 2013, Anderson worked with her daughter Dee, a jazz singer, on a concept for a new TV series named The Last Station.

In 2015, Anderson briefly returned to the Thunderbirds universe, when she guest-starred in an episode of the reboot TV series, Thunderbirds Are Go, as Great Aunt Sylvia, a relative of Lady Penelope.

Anderson was also known for her charity work, particularly in support of Breast Cancer Care and Barnardo's.

Recognition
In 1966, Thunderbirds received the Royal Television Society Silver Medal.

In 2015, Anderson travelled to Italy to receive a Pulcinella Award in recognition of her career in television production.

Personal life and death
In 1946, Anderson married Jack Brooks, with whom she had a daughter, Dee. The marriage ended in divorce and in 1952 she married George Thamm, this marriage also ending in divorce. Her third marriage, in 1960, was to Gerry Anderson, with whom she had a son, Gerry Anderson Jr, before divorcing Anderson in 1981.

Sylvia Anderson died on 15 March 2016, ten days before her 89th birthday.

Television

AP Films

 The Adventures of Twizzle (1957–59) – production assistant
 Torchy the Battery Boy (first series) (1960) – production assistant
 Four Feather Falls (1960) – production assistant
 Supercar (1961–62) – dialogue director, voice artist
 Fireball XL5 (1962–63) – voice artist
 Stingray (1964–65) – production assistant, voice artist
 Thunderbirds (1965–66) – character development, voice artist

Century 21

 Captain Scarlet and the Mysterons (1967–68) – character development, voice artist
 Joe 90 (1968–69) – character development, voice artist
 The Secret Service (1969) – character development, voice artist
 UFO (1970–71) – costume designer

Group Three

 The Protectors (1972–74) – writer
 Space: 1999 (1975–77) – producer ("Year One")

ITV Studios and Pūkeko Pictures
 Thunderbirds Are Go (2015) – voice artist (as Great Aunt Sylvia)

Filmography
 Crossroads to Crime (1960) – production assistant, uncredited acting role
 Thunderbirds Are Go (1966) – co-writer, co-producer, voice artist
 Thunderbird 6 (1968) – co-writer, co-producer, voice artist
 Doppelgänger (1969) a.k.a. Journey to the Far Side of the Sun (US title) – co-writer, co-producer
 Thunderbirds (2004) – production consultant

References

External links
 

1927 births
2016 deaths
20th-century English actresses
20th-century English novelists
20th-century English women writers
21st-century English women writers
Actresses from London
Alumni of the London School of Economics
Audiobook narrators
British media executives
British women television producers
British television producers
Businesspeople from London
English autobiographers
English company founders
English costume designers
English expatriates in the United States
English film producers
English female screenwriters
English talent agents
English television producers
English television writers
English voice actresses
English women in business
English women novelists
HBO people
People from Bray, Berkshire
Television show creators
English voice directors
Women autobiographers
British women television writers
Writers from London
English women non-fiction writers
20th-century English businesspeople